Lowell Park may refer to:

Lowell Park (ballpark), a ballpark in Cotuit, Massachusetts
Lowell Park (Dixon, Illinois), a municipal park
Lowell Park (novel)